= Giuseppe Valdagno =

Italian physician (16th century)

Giuseppe Valdagno (16th century) was an Italian physician from Verona.

His biographical history was written by the Brescian physician Girolamo Donzellini. Among Valdagno's works are:

- De Theriacae usu in Febribus pestilentibus (1570) Brescia
- De mixtione Dialogi Duo (1562) Basil
- Proclo del moto
- Die Quaestiones medicae (1568) Pavia
- Eudoxi Philalethis Apologia (1573) Verona
